Year 1189 (MCLXXXIX) was a common year starting on Sunday (link will display the full calendar) of the Julian calendar. In English law, 1189 - specifically the beginning of the reign of Richard I - is considered the end of time immemorial.

Events 
 By place 

 Europe 
 May 11 – Emperor Frederick I (Barbarossa) sets out from Regensburg, at the head of a German expeditionary force (some 15,000 men, including 4,000 knights). He has ensured that his lands are safe while he is away on crusade and leaves his son Henry VI in charge of the country. After leaving Germany, Frederick's army is increased by a contingent of 2,000 men led by Prince Géza, younger brother of King Béla III of Hungary. On July 27, he arrives at Niš and is welcomed by Stefan Nemanja, Grand Prince of Serbia. In order to ease his passage, Frederick makes diplomatic contacts with Hungary, the Byzantine Empire and the Seljuk Sultanate of Rum.
 July 6 – King Henry II dies at Chinon, near Tours, after doing homage to Philip II (Augustus), and surrendering the territories around Issoudun in the Centre-Val de Loire. He ends the hostilities against Philip, by agreeing to the peace terms and pays him 20,000 marks in tribute. Henry is succeeded by his son, Richard I (the Lionheart), as ruler of England.
 August – Emperor Isaac II (Angelos) denies any crusader access and begins to hinder the German forces, who try to cross the Byzantine frontier. Frederick I progresses with force, by capturing Philippopolis and defeats a Byzantine army (some 3,000 men) that attempts to recapture the city. The Germans are delayed for six months in Thrace.
 King Sancho I (the Populator) turns his attention towards the Moorish small kingdoms (called taifas) and begins a campaign in southern Portugal. With the help of crusader forces he conquers the town of Silves during the Reconquista. He orders the fortification of the city and builds a castle. Sancho styles himself "King of Silves".
 November 11 – King William II (the Good) makes peace with Isaac II, he abandons Thessalonika and other conquests, and dies childless at Palermo. The Sicilian nobles elect Tancred of Lecce (illegitimate son of Roger II) as the new ruler of Sicily, instead of Princess Constance and her husband Henry VI, to avoid German rule.
 Frederick I grants Hamburg the status of a free imperial city and tax-free access (or free-trade zone) up the Lower Elbe into the North Sea. He also grants the right to fish, to cut trees and the freedom of military service.

 England 
 September 3 – Richard I is crowned king of England in Westminster Abbey. During the coronation, a number of notable Jews are expelled from the banquet and rumours spread that Richard has ordered a massacre of the Jews. This causes anti-Jewish violence in London and York, among those killed is Jacob of Orléans, a respected French Jewish scholar.
 William Marshal marries the 17-year-old Isabel de Clare (daughter of Richard de Clare). Through his marriage to Isabel he becomes 1st Earl of Pembroke, acquiring huge estates in England, Normandy, Wales and Ireland.
 December 5 – King William I (the Lion) of Scotland gives Richard I 10,000 marks to buy his kingdom's independence. This overturns the Treaty of Falaise which William had to sign when he was captured (see 1174).
 December – Richard I sets sail with a crusader army from Dover Castle to France. To ensure he has the allegiance of his brother John, Richard approves of his marriage to their cousin Isabella of Gloucester.
 Winter – John awards land to Bertram de Verdun, a Norman nobleman, and grants Dundalk its charter with town privileges, which becomes a strategic Anglo-Norman stronghold in Ireland.

 Levant 
 May – Saladin has reconquered the Crusader Kingdom of Jerusalem except for Tyre. The castles of Montréal and Kerak are captured by Muslim forces. In the north, Saladin has regained the Principality of Antioch except for Antioch and the castle of Al-Qusayr in Syria.
 August 28 – Siege of Acre: King Guy of Lusignan moves from Tyre, where Conrad of Montferrat refuses to hand over the city. Guy and his crusader army (some 7,000 men, including 400 knights) besiege Acre. He makes camp outside, to wait for more reinforcements. 
 September – Guy of Lusignan receives reinforcements of some 12,000 men from Denmark, Germany, England, France, and Flanders. He encircles Acre with a double line of fortified positions. On September 15, Saladin launches a failed attack on Guy's camp.
 October 4 – Guy of Lusignan leads the crusader forces to launch a full-on assault on Saladin's camp. With heavy casualties on both sides, neither force gains the upperhand. On October 26, Saladin moves his camp from Acre to Mount Carmel (modern Israel).
 October 30 – An Egyptian fleet (some 50 ships) breaks through the crusader blockade at Acre and reinforces the port-city with some 10,000 men, as well as food and weapons.
 December – An Egyptian fleet reopens communications with Acre. The rest of the winter passes without major incidents, but the supply situation is poor in the besieged city.

 Asia 
 February 18 – Emperor Xiao Zong abdicates in favour of his son, Guang Zong, as ruler of the Song Dynasty. Xiao Zong becomes a Taishang Huang ("Retired Emperor") and remains as the de facto ruler of China.

 By topic 

 Literature 
 August 29 – Ban Kulin, Bosnian ruler, writes the Charter of Ban Kulin, which becomes a symbolic "birth certificate" of Bosnian language and statehood.

Births 
 Al-Mansur Nasir al-Din Muhammad, Ayyubid sultan (d. 1217)
 Archambaud VIII (the Great), French nobleman (d. 1242)
 Ferdinand of Castile, Spanish prince (infante) (d. 1211)
 Pietro Pettinaio, Italian comb-maker and saint (d. 1289)
 Peter Nolasco, French religious leader (d. 1256)
 Skule Bårdsson, Norwegian nobleman (d. 1240)
 Sukaphaa, founder of the Ahom Kingdom (d. 1268)
 Yuri II of Vladimir, Kievan Grand Prince (d. 1238)

Deaths 
 January 1 – Henry of Marcy, French cardinal-bishop (b. 1136)
 January 20 – Shi Zong (or Wulu), Chinese emperor (b. 1123)
 February 4 – Gilbert of Sempringham, English priest (b. 1085)
 March 4 – Humbert III (the Blessed), count of Savoy (b. 1136)
 March 25 – Frederick, duke of Bohemia (House of Přemyslid)
 June 15 – Minamoto no Yoshitsune, Japanese general (b. 1159)
 June 28 – Matilda of England, duchess of Saxony (b. 1156) 
 July 6 – Henry II (Curtmantle), king of England (b. 1133)
 July 20 – Muneko, Japanese princess and empress (b. 1126)
 September 3 – Jacob of Orléans, French Jewish scholar
 October 4 
 André of Brienne, French nobleman and knight (b. 1135)
 Gerard de Ridefort, Flemish Grand Master (b. 1140)
 October 14 – Fujiwara no Yasuhira, Japanese nobleman (b. 1155) 
 November 11 – William II (the Good), king of Sicily (b. 1153)
 November 14 – William de Mandeville, English nobleman
 Anvari, Persian astronomer, poet and writer (b. 1126)
 Benedict of York, English banker and moneylender
 Benkei, Japanese warrior monk (sōhei) (b. 1155)
 Conchobar Maenmaige Ua Conchobair, Irish king
 Conon II (or Cono), count of Montaigu and Duras
 Elizabeth of Hungary, German duchess (b. 1145)
 Folmar of Karden, German archbishop (b. 1135)
 Geoffrey Ridel, English bishop and Lord Chancellor
 Hugh de Cressy, Norman nobleman and constable 
 Hugh de Paduinan, Scoto-Norman nobleman (b. 1140)
 Richard de Morville, Scottish Lord High Constable
 Romano Bobone, Italian cardinal and papal legate
 William de Tracy, English nobleman and knight

References